Boudin is a surname. Notable people with the surname include:

A family of American legal figures and activists
Louis B. Boudin (1874–1952), American Marxist intellectual and lawyer
Leonard Boudin (1912–1989), American civil liberties lawyer (nephew of Louis B. Boudin)
Michael Boudin (born 1939), American judge
Kathy Boudin (1943–2022), former Weather Underground member convicted of murder, and adjunct professor at Columbia University
Chesa Boudin (born 1980), American lawyer, Former District Attorney of San Francisco

others:
Eugène Boudin (1824–1898), French landscape painter
Isidore Boudin, founder of Boudin Bakery in San Francisco, California
Stéphane Boudin (1888–1967), French interior designer

See also
Bodin (surname)

Boudin family